The Sardar Mahadik family of Gwalior State are a Maratha family who once held noble rank. The family's roots lie with Yashwant Rao Mahadik, who accompanied Mahadji Scindia to Gwalior from the Deccan.

Lieutenant-Colonel Sardar Krishna Rao Mahadik

Lt. Col. Sardar Krishna Rao Mahadik was born on 12 June 1902 in Gwalior. He studied in Sardar school, now known as Scindia school, in Gwalior and then did his diploma course from Mayo College, Ajmer. After his return he was married to Gunwantabai Mahadik the younger sister of Maharani Gajraraje Scindia, wife of Madhav Rao Scindia (Senior) from the Rane family of Goa.

His first assignment was as Collector of Guna in Gwalior state. He then became the General Manager of Gwalior power house and was subsequently commissioned as a Lieutenant-Colonel in artillery section of the Gwalior and British army. Later on he became Commerce, Industries and communication minister of Gwalior State at the time of Maharaja Jivaji Rao Scindia during merger of Gwalior state into the union of India. He was finance minister and went to America for negotiation with the President and took part in the princely conference representing Maharaja Gwalior during the merger.

As a minister of Gwalior state he wrote a book titled Economic Planning for Gwalior. In his old age he was involved in a court case involving a land dispute in Poona. He died in 1967 before the case was resolved, leaving five daughters and a son, Sadashiv Rao Mahadik.

References

Indian families
Hindu families